Matthew Silverman (born May 20, 1976) is an American professional baseball executive. He is currently the co-president, along with Brian Auld, of the Tampa Bay Rays of Major League Baseball (MLB).

Biography

Silverman is Jewish and was raised in a Jewish family, He graduated cum laude from Harvard College in 1998 after graduating from St. Mark's School of Texas in Dallas.

Silverman began his career at Goldman Sachs in its merchant banking division. At the company he helped Stuart Sternberg structure his bid to purchase a controlling interest in Major League Baseball's Tampa Bay Devil Rays. Silverman was hired as president of the team and became part of the transition group that changed the name of the franchise from the Devil Rays to the Rays. Under his leadership, the team moved from last place to a berth in the World Series in 2008. In January 2009, Street & Smith's Sports Business Journal named Silverman to its 2009 "Forty Under 40" list which honors accomplished and promising sports executives under the age of 40.

Silverman served as team president for nine years before he was named the director of baseball operations in 2014. He returned to the role of team president in 2017.

He currently resides in St. Petersburg, Florida, and he is the team representative at the Tampa Bay Partnership. He is a board member of the Pinellas Education Foundation, the Positive Coaching Alliance, the Hillsborough Education Foundation, and Starting Right, Now.

See also 
Notable alumni of St. Mark's School of Texas

References

External links
Biography at MLB.com

1976 births
Living people
Major League Baseball executives
Major League Baseball team presidents
Tampa Bay Rays executives
Jewish American baseball people
Harvard College alumni
St. Mark's School (Texas) alumni
Tampa Bay Rowdies executives
21st-century American Jews